Manuela Beatriz Mena Marqués (born 30 January 1949 in Madrid) is a Spanish art historian and curator of 18th century art at the Museo del Prado. She is considered one of the leading experts on Francisco Goya.

References 

1949 births
Living people
Spanish curators
Spanish art historians
People from Madrid